Rush Creek is a  tributary of Big Sandy Creek in Colorado.  It starts at the confluence of South Rush Creek and North Rush Creek in Lincoln County.  The creek flows through Cheyenne County before joining Big Sandy Creek in Kiowa County.

See also
List of rivers of Colorado

References

Rivers of Colorado
Tributaries of the Arkansas River
Rivers of Kiowa County, Colorado
Rivers of Cheyenne County, Colorado
Rivers of Lincoln County, Colorado